Xiajiao Station  is a station on Line 3 of the Guangzhou Metro that started operations on 28December 2006. It is located under Xiajiao Village in Luoxi Island, Panyu District of Guangzhou. It is near Wuzhou Decoration Center, Shaxi Plastic Center, the White Palace Hotel and the White Palace Theater.

Station layout

Exits

References

Railway stations in China opened in 2006
Guangzhou Metro stations in Panyu District